According to records from the RSSSF, there were many association football cup competitions organized in Zambia since 1962, some of which are the Independence Cup, the Zambian Challenge Cup (both organized in 1961), the Champion of Champions Cup (organized in 1974) and Zambian Coca-Cola Cup, the latter which began in 2001. These competitions are either inactive or were played no more as of 2009.

Independence Cup
The Northern Rhodesia Castle Cup, rebranded two years later as the Independence Cup due to the independence of Zambia, was launched in 1962 by the Football Association of Zambia as the top knockout tournament in Zambian football. Until 1965, the winners of this competition were pitted against the winners of the cup competition in Southern Rhodesia (now Zimbabwe) in the "Super Castle Cup" (the equivalent of today's super cups).

Its winners did not always enter the African Cup Winners' Cup; an entry was often reserved for the winners of the African Cup of Champions Clubs (now the CAF Champions League) which usually contested between four clubs.

It got rebranded as the Mosi Cup in 1993 and has not been played or organized since its last edition in 2007.

Northern Rhodesia Castle Cup
1961 : City of Lusaka
1962 : Roan United
1963 : Mufulira Blackpool

Independence Cup

1964 : City of Lusaka
1965 : Mufulira Wanderers
1966 : Mufulira Wanderers
1967 : Kabwe Warriors
1968 : Mufulira Wanderers
1969 : Kabwe Warriors
1970 : Ndola United
1971 : Mufulira Wanderers
1972 : Kabwe Warriors
1973 : Mufulira Wanderers
1974 : Mufulira Wanderers
1975 : Mufulira Wanderers
1976 : Mufulira Blackpool
1977 : Roan United
1978 : Nchanga Rangers
1979 : Power Dynamos
1980 : Power Dynamos
1981 : Vitafoam United
1982 : Power Dynamos
1983 : Konkola Blades
1984 : Kabwe Warriors
1985 : Strike Rovers
1986 : Nkana Red Devils
1987 : Kabwe Warriors
1988 : Mufulira Wanderers
1989 : Nkana Red Devils
1990 : Power Dynamos
1991 : Nkana Red Devils
1992 : Nkana

Mosi Cup

1993 : Nkana
1994 : Roan United  
1995 : Mufulira Wanderers
1996 : Roan United
1997 : Power Dynamos
1998 : Konkola Blades
1999 : Zamsure
2000 : Nkana
2001 : Power Dynamos
2002 : Zanaco
2003 : Power Dynamos
2004 : Lusaka Celtic
2005 : Green Buffaloes
2006 : ZESCO United
2007 : Red Arrows

Champion of Champions Cup
The Champion of Champions Cup was a cup competition in Zambian football active from 1974 to 1993. It was played by the teams who finished in the top 4 places in the country's football league system (the equivalence of the "GHALCA Top 4" in Ghana). It was named under various sponsorships; Cadbury Schweppes (1974-1975), the Zambian State Lottery (1976-78) and the Zambia Railways (1979). The winners of this competition occasionally get invited to compete in the African Cup Winners' Cup.

1974: Mufulira Wanderers
1975: Green Buffaloes
1976: Mufulira Wanderers
1977: Mufulira Wanderers
1978: Mufulira Wanderers
1979: Green Buffaloes
1980: Power Dynamos
1981: Power Dynamos
1982: Green Buffaloes
1983: Red Arrows
1984 Power Dynamos      
1985 Mufulira Wanderers
1986 Vitafoam United or Nkana Red Devils
1987 Kabwe Warriors
1988 Mufulira Wanderers
1989 Kabwe Warriors        
1990 Power Dynamos
1991 Kabwe Warriors
1992 Mufulira Wanderers
1993 Nkana Red Devils

Zambian Challenge Cup
The Northern Rhodesian Challenge Cup is a currently-defunct knockout tournament in Zambian football created in 1962 and originally played by teams featuring all-white teams. Following Northern Rhodesia's independence as Zambia and the competition's rebranding as the Zambian Challenge  Cup in 1964, it included teams featuring black people in the country.

The competition was contested by the top 8 teams of the country's league system (the equivalence of South Africa's MTN 8).

It was known by sponsorship names; the BAT Challenge Cup (1962–68), the Shell Challenge Cup (1969–1981) and the BP Challenge Cup/BP Top Eight Cup (since 1982) as sponsors withdrew from the country.

1962 : City of Lusaka
1963 : City of Lusaka
1964 : Rhokana United
1965 : Nchanga Rangers
1966 : Rhokana United
1967 : Mufulira Wanderers	
1968 : Mufulira Wanderers
1969 : Mufulira Wanderers
1970 : Kabwe Warriors
1971 : Kitwe United
1972 : Kabwe Warriors
1973 : Nchanga Rangers
1974 : Roan United
1975 : Green Buffaloes
1976 : Nchanga Rangers
1977 : Green Buffaloes
1978 : Mufulira Wanderers
1979 : Green Buffaloes
1980 : Ndola United
1981 : Green Buffaloes
1982 : Red Arrows
1983 : Roan United
1984 : Mufulira Wanderers
1985 : Green Buffaloes
1986 : Mufulira Wanderers
1987 : Zanaco
1988 : Zanaco
1989 : Kabwe Warriors
1990 : Power Dynamos
1991 : Kabwe Warriors
1992 : Nkana
1993 : Nkana
1994 : Mufulira Wanderers
1995 : Roan United
1996 : Mufulira Wanderers
1997 : Mufulira Wanderers
1998 : Nkana
1999 : Nkana
2000 : Nkana
2001 : Power Dynamos
2002 : Kabwe Warriors
2003 : Kabwe Warriors
2004 : Kitwe United
2005 : Kabwe Warriors
2006 : Zanaco
2007 : Kabwe Warriors
2008 : Lusaka Dynamos

Zambian Coca-Cola Cup
The Zambian Coca-Cola Cup''' is an Zambian seasonal association football club tournament sponsored by Coca-Cola which was active from 2001 to 2007. It is succeeded by the Barclays Cup (now the ABSA Cup).

2001: Zanaco
2002: Chambishi Blackburn
2003: Power Dynamos
2004: Zanaco
2005: Forest Rangers
2006: Kabwe Warriors
2007: ZESCO United

Source
History of the Zambian football cup competitions 1962–2008 via RSSSF

Reference

Football competitions in Zambia
Coca-Cola
National association football cups
Recurring sporting events established in 1962
Defunct sporting events